Lamoureux is a surname of French origin. People with the name include:
Abraham-César Lamoureux (c. 1640–1692), sculptor who worked in Sweden and Denmark
Claude Lamoureux (c. 1650–after 1699), sculptor in Sweden and Denmark; younger brother of Abraham-César Lamoureux
Charles Lamoureux (1834–1899), founder of the Orchestre Lamoureux
Denis Lamoureux (contemporary), Canadian professor of science and religion
Diane Lamoureux (born 1954), Canadian professor and writer
François Lamoureux (1946–2006), French and European civil servant
Gisèle Lamoureux (born 1942), Québécoise photographer, botanist, and ecologist
Jean-Philippe Lamoureux (born 1984), American professional ice hockey player; brother of Jocelyne and Monique
Jocelyne Lamoureux (born 1989), American Olympic ice hockey player; twin sister of Monique, sister of Jean-Philippe
Justin Lamoureux (born 1976), Canadian snowboarder
Kevin Lamoureux (born 1962), Canadian politician from Manitoba
Leo Lamoureux (1916–1961), Canadian professional ice hockey player
Lucie Lamoureux-Bruneau (1877–1951), Canadian philanthropist and a city councillor of Montreal
Lucien Lamoureux (France) (1888–1970), French politician and government minister
Lucien Lamoureux (1920–1998), Canadian politician from Ontario
Mario Lamoureux (born 1988), American professional ice hockey player; brother of Jean-Philippe, Jocelyne and Monique
Maurice Lamoureux (contemporary), Canadian politician from Ontario
Mitch Lamoureux (born 1962), Canadian professional ice hockey player
Monique Lamoureux-Kolls (born 1989), American Olympic ice hockey player; twin sister of Jocelyne, sister of Jean-Philippe
Mylène Lamoureux (born 1986), Canadian ice dancer
Robert Lamoureux (born 1920), French actor, screenwriter, and film director

See also
Lamoreaux, americanized surname
Lamoureux, Alberta, a hamlet in Alberta, Canada